Radio SRF 1 is a Swiss radio channel, one of six operated by Schweizer Radio und Fernsehen (SRF), with its headquarters in Zürich.

It was launched in 1931 as Radio Beromünster (named after the Beromünster municipality on which its original transmission tower was located) and was the first German-language radio station for German-speaking Switzerland.

Programmes 

The channel is receivable throughout Switzerland via FM, DAB, cable, and satellite. It is also streamed on the internet.

Programming is mainly general and includes news and entertainment, as well as satire, games, and radio broadcasts for children.

Radio SRF 1 broadcasts regional content several times a day in the following areas of German-speaking Switzerland:
 Aargau / Solothurn
 Basel
 Bern - Fribourg - Valais
 Central Switzerland
 Eastern Switzerland
 Zürich / Schaffhausen

Former logos

External links 

1931 establishments in Switzerland
Radio stations established in 1931
German-language radio stations in Switzerland
Mass media in Zürich